Dražanj (Serbian Cyrillic: Дражањ) is a suburban settlement of Belgrade, Serbia. It is located in the municipality of Grocka.

Dražanj is located in the southern part of the municipality, in the northern Šumadija region, between the macro-region of Podunavlje and the northeastern slopes of Kosmaj mountain. It is situated 37 km southeast of Belgrade on the Ralja river and on both the rail and the highway connecting Belgrade and Niš.

Dražanj is classified as a rural settlement (village) and is one of the most depopulating settlements in the municipality (population of 1,855 in 1991, and 1,548 in 2002). Its economy is almost entirely based on agriculture.

Suburbs of Belgrade
Šumadija